Lenny Druyts (born 18 May 1997) is a Belgian professional racing cyclist, who currently rides for UCI Women's Continental Team . As a junior rider she competed in the women's junior road race at the 2014 UCI Road World Championships and 2015 UCI Road World Championships.

Her sisters Jessy Druyts, Demmy Druyts and Kelly Druyts, as well as her brother Gerry Druyts are all professional cyclists.

Major results
2016
3rd Team pursuit, Grand Prix of Poland (with Nathalie Bex, Lotte Kopecky and Kaat Van der Meulen)

See also
 List of 2016 UCI Women's Teams and riders

References

External links
 

1997 births
Living people
Belgian female cyclists
People from Wilrijk
Cyclists from Antwerp
21st-century Belgian women